Angélica Pozo is a clay artist from Cleveland. She is also an author, teacher, and exhibit curator.

Life 
Pozo is from New York City. She was born to Cuban and Puerto Rican parents. She earned her BFA from SUNY College of Ceramics, and her Masters of Fine Arts at the University of Michigan.

She then moved to Cleveland in 1984, and resides in Tremont, Cleveland. She is self-employed.

Work 
Pozo's art includes tile and sculptural studio work. She has also taught art for over 30 years. For her work, she was awarded an Individual Artist Fellowship by the Ohio Arts Council.

Pozo is known for the following public art commissions:
 "Welcome Mat", a mosaic tile rug at the East 9th–North Coast station that represents Cleveland's ethnic diversity
 "Stephanie Tubbs Jones Memorial Wall" at University Circle
 tile wall in Quincy Park in Fairfax, Cleveland illustrating historical community photographs from 1879-2006

Collections and exhibitions 
Pozo's work is available in the following collections:
 American Craft Museum, New York City
 Museum of Arts and Design, New York City
 Private collection for LeBron James

She has been involved with the following exhibitions:
 International Ceramic Public Art Exhibition, 1998, Taipei, Taiwan
 "21st Century Ceramics in the United States & Canada", 2003
 2019 exhibit at Kent State University

Selected publications

References

External links 
 
 

20th-century ceramists
American people of Cuban descent
American people of Puerto Rican descent
American women ceramists
American ceramists
Year of birth missing (living people)
Living people
21st-century American women